Sandun Mendis (born 13 March 2001) is a Sri Lankan cricketer. He made his List A debut on 22 December 2019, for Colombo Cricket Club in the 2019–20 Invitation Limited Over Tournament. He made his Twenty20 debut on 4 March 2021, for Chilaw Marians Cricket Club in the 2020–21 SLC Twenty20 Tournament.

References

External links
 

2001 births
Living people
Sri Lankan cricketers
Chilaw Marians Cricket Club cricketers
Colombo Cricket Club cricketers
Place of birth missing (living people)